Lincoln Township is a township in Jackson County, Kansas, USA.  As of the 2000 census, its population was 1,046. The township is located entirely within the Prairie Band Potawatomi Indian Reservation.

Geography
Lincoln Township covers an area of 98.35 square miles (254.73 square kilometers); of this, 0.04 square miles (0.12 square kilometers) or 0.05 percent is water. The streams of Big Elm Creek, Crow Creek, Little Elm Creek and South Branch Soldier Creek run through this township.

Adjacent townships
 Banner Township (north)
 Franklin Township (northeast)
 Cedar Township (east)
 Douglas Township (southeast)
 Washington Township (southwest)
 Adrian Township (west)
 Grant Township (northwest)

Cemeteries
The township contains three cemeteries: Danceground, Mitchell and Shipsee.

Major highways
 U.S. Route 75

References
 U.S. Board on Geographic Names (GNIS)
 United States Census Bureau cartographic boundary files

External links
 US-Counties.com
 City-Data.com

Townships in Jackson County, Kansas
Townships in Kansas